William Field (17 March 1816 – 22 June 1890) was an Australian cricketer, who played one game for Tasmania. 

Field was born in Port Dalrymple, Tasmania. He has the distinction of having participated in the first ever first-class match in Australia, in which he unfortunately failed to make an impact.

Field died on 22 June 1890, in Bishopsbourne, Tasmania at the age of 74.

See also
 List of Tasmanian representative cricketers

External links

1816 births
1890 deaths
Australian cricketers
Tasmania cricketers
Cricketers from Launceston, Tasmania